Inga leptantha is a species of plant in the family Fabaceae. The plant is endemic to the Atlantic Forest ecoregion in southeastern Brazil.

References

leptantha
Endemic flora of Brazil
Flora of the Atlantic Forest
Vulnerable flora of South America
Taxa named by George Bentham
Taxonomy articles created by Polbot